The 2013 Under 21 Women's Australian Championships was a women's Field Hockey tournament held in the Northern Territory city of Darwin.

Queensland won the gold medal after defeating New South Wales 2–1 in a penalty shoot-out following a 1–1 draw. South Australia won the bronze medal by defeating Australian Capital Territory 1–0 in the third and fourth playoff.

Competition format

The tournament is played in a round-robin format, with each team facing each other once. Final placings after the pool matches determine playoffs.

The bottom four teams play in the classification round. Two crossover matches are played, with the fifth placed team playing the eighth place team and the sixth placed team facing the seventh placed team. The winners of the crossover matches progress to the fifth and sixth place playoff, while the losers contest the seventh and eighth place playoff.

The top four teams contest the medal round. Two semi-finals are played, with the first placed team taking on the fourth placed team and the second placed team taking on the third placed team. The winners progress to the final, while the losers contest the third and fourth place playoff.

Teams

  ACT
  NSW
  NT
  QLD
  SA
  TAS
  VIC
  WA

Results

Pool matches

Classification matches

Fifth to eighth place classification

Crossover

Seventh and eighth place

Fifth and sixth place

First to fourth place classification

Semi-finals

Third and fourth place

Final

Awards

Statistics

Final standings

Goalscorers

9 Goals
 Kathryn Slattery
8 Goals
 Jessica Watterson
6 Goals
 Nina Khoury
 Mariah Williams
5 Goals
 Brooke Peris
 Murphy Allendorf
 Courtney Rudd
4 Goals
 Esther Hotham
 Maddison Rosser
 Jodie Cliffe
 Madison Fitzpatrick
 Elysia Burvill
 Georgia Wilson
3 Goals
 Naomi Evans
 Kate Gilmore
 Georgina Morgan
 Georgia Pascoe
2 Goals
 Laura Gray
 Caitlin Rosser
 Yasmin Osborne
 Jacqui Day
 Georgia Hillas
 Natalie Gibbs
 Gabrielle Nance
 Eloise Sobels
 Michaela Spano
 Megan Anderson
 Laura Barden
 Sarah Forsyth
 Nicola Hammond
 Hayley Padget
 Penny Squibb
1 Goal
 Jenna Cartwright
 Kalindi Commerford
 Stef Kindon
 Jess Smith
 Tina Taseska
 Lily Brazel
 Greta Hayes
 Cara Williams
 Sophie Kerrigan
 Tayla Ainslie
 Brooke Anderson
 Stephanie Kershaw
 Kazzia Lammon
 Jamie Stone
 Emily Grist
 Leah Welstead
 Tayla Britton
 Darcie Filliponi
 Elizabeth Flack
 Isabelle Peskett
 Anna Robinson
 Rachel Barclay
 Kyra Flynn
 Rachel Frusher
 Maddie Smith
 Katy Symons

External links

References

2013
2013 in Australian women's field hockey
Sports competitions in the Northern Territory
Sport in Darwin, Northern Territory